Baccharis plummerae is a California species of Baccharis known by the common name Plummer's baccharis. It is named in honor of American botanist Sara Plummer Lemmon, 1836 – 1923.

Distribution
The plant is endemic to chaparral habitats in Southern California. It can be found on the coastline, and in the Western Transverse Ranges, Outer South California Coast Ranges, and on the northern Channel Islands of California. Most of the populations are in a region from southern Monterey County to Los Angeles County, but there are a few isolated populations reported from Riverside County.

Description
Baccharis plummerae is a bushy shrub producing many erect, slender stems approaching  in maximum height.

The leaves are linear to oblong in shape and sometimes have fine teeth along the edges.

The shrub is dioecious, with male and female plants producing flower heads of different types. The head is enclosed in a layer of phyllaries which are glandular and sticky.

See also
Coastal sage scrub
California coastal sage and chaparral ecoregion

References

External links

Jepson Manual Treatment of Baccharis plummerae

plummerae
Endemic flora of California
Natural history of the California chaparral and woodlands
Natural history of the California Coast Ranges
Natural history of the Channel Islands of California
Natural history of the Santa Monica Mountains
Natural history of the Transverse Ranges
Plants described in 1879
Flora without expected TNC conservation status